Justice of the Common Pleas was a puisne judicial position within the Court of Common Pleas of England and Wales, under the Chief Justice. The Common Pleas was the primary court of common law within England and Wales, dealing with "common" pleas (civil matters between subject and subject). It was created out of the common law jurisdiction of the Exchequer of Pleas, with splits forming during the 1190s and the division becoming formal by the beginning of the 13th century. The court became a key part of the Westminster courts, along with the Exchequer of Pleas (qualified to hear cases involving revenue owed to the King) and the Court of King's Bench (authorised to hear cases involving the King), but with the Writ of Quominus and the Statute of Westminster, both tried to extend their jurisdiction into the realm of common pleas. As a result, the courts jockeyed for power. In 1828 Henry Brougham, a Member of Parliament, complained in Parliament that as long as there were three courts unevenness was inevitable, saying that "It is not in the power of the courts, even if all were monopolies and other restrictions done away, to distribute business equally, as long as suitors are left free to choose their own tribunal", and that there would always be a favourite court, which would therefore attract the best lawyers and judges and entrench its position. The outcome was the Supreme Court of Judicature Act 1873, under which all the central courts were made part of a single Supreme Court of Judicature. Eventually the government created a High Court of Justice under Lord Coleridge by an Order in Council of 16 December 1880. At this point, the Common Pleas formally ceased to exist.

The number of Justices at any one time varied; between 1377 and 1420 there were generally four, switching to five from 1420 to 1471. From 1471 onwards, the number was fixed at 3. This changed in the 19th century; provisions were made for the appointment of a Fourth Justice and Fifth Justice in 1830 and 1868 respectively. From the start of the 14th century, Justices were appointed via letters patent made under the Great Seal, and held their appointments "under the pleasure of the King". Justices received the same remuneration as judges of the Exchequer of Pleas and Court of King's Bench; £1,000 in 1660, increased  to £2,000 in 1759 and £4,000 in 1809. From 1799, pensions were also awarded to retiring Justices.

List of Justices

References

Bibliography

Justice of the Court of Common Pleas
Justice of the Court of Common Pleas